The Vancouver Canucks are a professional ice hockey team based in Vancouver, British Columbia. The Canucks are a member of the Pacific Division in the Western Conference of the National Hockey League (NHL). The Canucks currently play home games at Rogers Arena. The Canucks joined the NHL in 1970 as an expansion team, along with the Buffalo Sabres. They have advanced to the Stanley Cup finals three times but were defeated by the New York Islanders in 1982, the New York Rangers in 1994, and the Boston Bruins in 2011. The Canucks are owned by Francesco Aquilini, Jim Rutherford is their interim general manager, and Bo Horvat is the team captain.

There have been 21 head coaches for the Canucks. The franchise's first head coach was Hal Laycoe, who coached the Canucks for two seasons. Alain Vigneault coached the most games of any Canucks head coach with 540 games and has the most points all-time with the Canucks with 683 points, he also has the most points in a season of any Canucks coach, with 117 in the 2010–11 season. He is followed by Marc Crawford, who has 586 points all-time with the Canucks Roger Neilson is the only Hockey Hall of Fame inductee to coach the Canucks. Quinn and Vigneault are the only two Canucks head coaches to win a Jack Adams Award with the team. Bill LaForge, who coached the start of the 1984–85 season, has the fewest points with the Canucks (10). Harry Neale served the most terms as head coach of the Canucks with three while Pat Quinn served two.

Key

Coaches

Note: Statistics are correct as of head coach Bruce Boudreau's firing on January 22, 2023.

Notes
 A running total of the number of coaches of the Canucks. Thus any coach who has two or more separate terms as head coach is only counted once.
 Before the 2005–06 season, the NHL instituted a penalty shootout for regular season games that remained tied after a five-minute overtime period, which prevented ties.
 Mike Sullivan acted as interim head coach of the Canucks for six games during their 2013–14 season, while Tortorella was serving a suspension.

References
General

 
Specific

 
Vancouver Canucks head coaches
head coaches